Amelia Campbell (born August 4, 1965) is a Canadian-born, American-raised actress. She was born in Montreal, Quebec, but grew up in Ithaca, New York. A stage and film actress, she has appeared in such films as The Paper, My Louisiana Sky, Single White Female, and Lorenzo's Oil.

Personal life
Campbell was born in Montreal but grew up in Ithaca, New York. She graduated from Syracuse University in 1988. She is married to Anthony Arkin (b. 1967), younger brother of actor Adam Arkin.

Career
In 1990, Campbell played a small role in The Exorcist III. In 1992 she played roles in Single White Female and Lorenzo's Oil. She appeared in Ron Howard's film The Paper in 1994. In 1999 she played Patty the stage manager in Macbeth in Manhattan, which was filmed in one of New York City's historic theatres.

In 2001 she played the role of Corinna Ramsey Parker in My Louisiana Sky, directed by her brother-in-law Adam Arkin. In 2008, she played Sandra Zeller in A Dog Year. She played Maggie Harmon in Tim Blake Nelson's 2010 film, Leaves of Grass, which starred Edward Norton. In 2016, she appeared in the Netflix series The OA

References

External links 
 

1965 births
Canadian emigrants to the United States
People from Ithaca, New York
Actresses from Montreal
Actresses from New York (state)
Syracuse University alumni
American film actresses
American stage actresses
Living people
21st-century American actresses